Leptopelis argenteus, also known as the silvery tree frog or triad tree frog, is a species of frog in the family Arthroleptidae. It is found in coastal Kenya and Tanzania and south to northern Mozambique, southern Malawi, and eastern highlands of Zimbabwe.

Taxonomy
This species was described by Georg Johann Pfeffer in 1893 based on a specimen collected south of Bagamoyo, Tanzania. Current accounts differ in its delimitation and distribution; the synonyms and distribution in this article follow the Amphibian Species of the World (ASW). However, the IUCN SSC Amphibian Specialist Group (2016) only reports it from Tanzania, possibly extending into Mozambique. The AmphibiaWeb gives a distribution similar to that in ASW, but recognizes Leptopelis broadleyi as a valid species. Furthermore, Leptopelis concolor is perhaps subspecies of Leptopelis argenteus.

Description
Depending on source, males measure  in snout–vent length (SVL), or males and females can be as large as  SVL, respectively. It resembles Leptopelis concolor morphologically but differs has two dark dorsolateral stripes and a more diffuse canthal and lateral line. Webbing in the feet is reduced. There is usually a dark triangle between the eyes.

Habitat and conservation
According to the IUCN SSC Amphibian Specialist Group, this species inhabits savanna woodland with many trees and bushes. It can survive in altered habitats, provided that good vegetation cover remains. Males call high up in bushes and grasses, also quite far from water. The eggs are laid in a nest buried in mud near water.

Leptopelis argenteus is a common and adaptable species that is not facing any significant threats. It is sometimes present in the international pet trade. It occurs in many protected areas.

References

argenteus
Frogs of Africa
Amphibians of Kenya
Amphibians of Malawi
Amphibians of Mozambique
Amphibians of Tanzania
Amphibians of Zimbabwe
Amphibians described in 1893
Taxa named by Georg Johann Pfeffer
Taxonomy articles created by Polbot